Barnstaple was a constituency centred on the town of Barnstaple in Devon, in the South West of England. It returned two Members of Parliament to the House of Commons of the Parliament of the United Kingdom until 1885, thereafter, one.

It was created in 1295 and abolished for the 1950 general election. Most of the area and the town falls into the North Devon seat.

Boundaries
1885–1918: The Municipal Boroughs of Barnstaple and Bideford, and the Sessional Divisions of Bideford and Braunton.

1918–1950: The Municipal Boroughs of Barnstaple and Bideford, the Urban Districts of Ilfracombe, Lynton, and Northam, and the Rural Districts of Barnstaple and Bideford (including Lundy Island).

Members of Parliament

1295–1885

1885–1950

Election results

Elections in the 1830s

Elections in the 1840s

Elections in the 1850s

 
 

The election was declared void on petition, due to bribery, causing a by-election.

 
 

Laurie's election was declared void on petition, due to bribery, causing a by-election.

 

 
 

 Prinsep withdrew from the election during polling.

Elections in the 1860s
Potts' death caused a by-election.

On petition, Lloyd's election was declared void due to bribery and, on 15 April 1864, Bremridge was declared elected.

Elections in the 1870s

Elections in the 1880s
Waddy resigned in order to contest Sheffield, causing a by-election.

Elections in the 1890s

Elections in the 1900s

Elections in the 1910s

General election 1914–15:

Another general election was required to take place before the end of 1915. The political parties had been making preparations for an election to take place and by the July 1914, the following candidates had been selected; 
Liberal: 
Unionist: Charles Sandbach Parker

Both candidates supported the Coalition Government; Rees may have received its endorsement.

Elections in the 1920s

Elections in the 1930s 

General election 1939–40:

Another general election was required to take place before the end of 1940. The political parties had been making preparations for an election to take place and by the Autumn of 1939, the following candidates had been selected; 
Liberal: Richard Acland
Conservative: Marjorie Graves

Elections in the 1940s

Notes

References 
Robert Beatson, "A Chronological Register of Both Houses of Parliament" (London: Longman, Hurst, Res & Orme, 1807) 
F W S Craig, "British Parliamentary Election Results 1832–1885" (2nd edition, Aldershot: Parliamentary Research Services, 1989)

Parliamentary constituencies in Devon (historic)
Constituencies of the Parliament of the United Kingdom established in 1295
Constituencies of the Parliament of the United Kingdom disestablished in 1950
Barnstaple